Guy Gabay (born 18 July 1993) is an Israeli former racing cyclist, who rode for the  team in 2015 and 2016. He won the 2016 Hets Hatsafon, and was a two-time runner-up in national road championship races.

References

External links

1993 births
Living people
Israeli male cyclists